Ruby Creek 2, normally referred to as Ruby Creek Indian Reserve No. 2, is an Indian reserve in the Upper Fraser Valley region of British Columbia, Canada, located at the mouth of Ruby Creek at the northeast end of the District of Kent, near the locality of the same name, which is a part of Kent.

References

Indian reserves in the Lower Mainland
Sto:lo